The Iranian records in swimming are the fastest ever performances of swimmers from Iran, which are recognised and ratified by the Iran Amateur Swimming Federation.

All records were set in finals unless noted otherwise.

Long Course (50 m)

Men

Women

Short Course (25 m)

Men

Women

References

Iran
Records
Swimming
Swimming